Oscar MacIntyre (born 21 December 2004) is a Scottish professional footballer who plays for Scottish Premiership club Hibernian as a left back. His younger brother Jacob is also a footballer, and is currently in the Hibernian academy. They are both cousins of professional golfer Robert MacIntyre.

Club career
MacIntyre signed for the Hibernian youth academy from Spartans in 2019, joining up with his younger brother Jacob. Oscar agreed to his first professional contract with Hibernian in April 2021 and made his first team debut in May 2022. Both brothers signed long-term contracts with Hibernian in August 2022.

Career statistics

References

2004 births
Living people
Place of birth missing (living people)
Scottish footballers
Hibernian F.C. players
Scottish Professional Football League players
Association football fullbacks
Spartans F.C. players